The South Dakota Governor's Residence is the official residence of the governor of South Dakota.  The first resident, Governor Mike Rounds, lived in the house after its dedication on August 3, 2005. Its current resident is Governor Kristi Noem.

Old Governor's Residence
The South Dakota governor's mansion, built across the small man-made pond from the South Dakota State Capitol Building by the Works Progress Administration in the 1930s. It was subsequently moved near Rapid City, South Dakota, when the construction of the new mansion began in the spring of 2004. The last Governor to live there was Mike Rounds.

New Governor's Residence
Construction began in the spring of 2004.  Private and business donations funded the new mansion.  The total cost of the project was $2.87 million.  The  residence is on the east shore of Capitol Lake, at 119 North Washington Avenue, in Pierre, South Dakota. Mike Rounds was the inaugural resident. The current resident of the mansion is Kristi Noem.

References
"Ceremony dedicates new governor's home", Capital Journal (Pierre). 4 August 2005.

External links 
State of South Dakota's Official Home Page, which includes a virtual tour of the Governor's Residence

Governors' mansions in the United States
Houses completed in 2005
Works Progress Administration in South Dakota
Government buildings in South Dakota
Governor of South Dakota